CERN (Conseil Européen pour la Recherche Nucléaire) is a particle physics lab in Europe. Cern or variations thereof, may refer to:

 Churches European Rural Network
 15332 CERN, an asteroid
 CERN httpd, the name of an httpd website software
 CERN Open Hardware Licence, the CERN license
 Cerner (former stock ticker: CERN), a U.S. health information technology company
 Rugby Club CERN (RC Cern), a rugby team
 The CERN Foundation (Collaborative Ependymoma Research Network), a non-profit cancer foundation
 , Romanian name of the medieval fortress of Chern located in modern Chernivtsi, Ukraine

See also

 
 Cerne (disambiguation)
 Kern (disambiguation)
 Sern (disambiguation)